Rath (An Ráth in Irish) is a townland in the historical Barony of Ormond Lower, County Tipperary, Ireland. Its location straddles the R438 road south of Walshpark in the civil parish of Dorrha.

References

Townlands of County Tipperary